The Ganesha Sahasranama (Sanskrit:) is a list of the names of Hindu deity Ganesha. A sahasranama is a Hindu hymn of praise in which a deity is referred to by 1,000 or more different names.  Ganesha Sahasranamas are recited in many temples today as a living part of Ganesha devotion.

There are two different major versions of the Ganesha Sahasranama, with subvariants of each version.

One major version appears in chapter I.46 of the Ganesha Purana, an important scripture of the Ganapatya.  This version provides an encyclopedic review of Ganesha's attributes and roles as they were understood by the Ganapatya. A Sanskrit commentary on a subvariant of this version of the Ganesha Sahasranama was written by Bhaskararaya..   Bhaskararaya titles his commentary Khadyota (“Firefly”), making a play on words based on two different meanings of this Sanskrit term.  In his opening remarks Bhaskararaya says that some will say that because the commentary is very brief it is inconsequential like a firefly (khadyota) but to devotees it will shine like the sun (khadyota).  The source text (Sanskrit:) of Bhaskararaya's Khadyota commentary generally follows the text of the 1993 reprint edition Ganesha Purana (GP-1993)
, but there are quite a few differences in names, and the versification differs slightly.  There are enough differences so that the  Bhaskararaya variant and the GP-1993 versions can be considered as distinct.
 
There is a completely different second major version in which all of the names begin with the letter 'g' (ग्). The names and structure of this version bear no resemblance to the Ganesha Purana version.

108 Names of Ganesha
(names here are transliterated from Sanskrit to Roman according to the south Indian tradition. For example, 'd' denotes hard d, ड, and 'dh' denotes soft d, द. Similarly 't' denotes hard t, ट, while 'th' denotes soft t, त.)
(Also see 108 Names of Ganesh.)

 Om Vinayakaaya Namah (ॐ विनायकाय नमः)
 Om Vighna-rajaaya Namah (ॐ विघ्नराजाय नमः)
 Om Gowri-puthraaya Namah (ॐ गौरीपुत्राय नमः)
 Om Ganeshwaraaya Namah (ॐ गणेश्वराय नमः)
 Om Skanda-grajaaya Namah (ॐ स्कंदाग्रजाय नमः)
 Om Avyayaaya Namah (ॐ अव्ययाय नमः)
 Om Puthaaya Namah (ॐ पूताय नमः)
 Om Dakshaaya Namah (ॐ दक्षाय नमः)
 Om Adhyakshaaya Namah (ॐ अध्यक्षाय नमः)
 Om Dwija-priyaaya Namah (ॐ द्विजप्रियाय नमः)
 Om Agni-garbha-chide Namah (ॐ अग्निगर्भच्छिदे नमः)
 Om Indhra-shri-pradaaya Namah (ॐ इन्द्रश्रीप्रदाय नमः)
 Om Vaani-pradaaya Namah (ॐ वाणीप्रदाय नमः)
 Om Pramodaya Namah (ॐ प्रमोदाय नमः)
 Om Sarva-siddhi-pradaaya Namah (ॐ सर्वसिद्धिप्रदाय नमः)
 Om Sarva-jyanayaaya Namah (ॐ सर्वज्ञानाय नमः)
 Om Sarva-priyaaya Namah (ॐ सर्वप्रियाय नमः)
 Om Sarvaatmakaaya Namah (ॐ सर्वात्मकाय नमः)
 Om Srishti-karthre Namah (ॐ सृष्टिकर्त्रे नमः)
 Om Dhevaaya Namah (ॐ देवाय नमः)
 Om Anekar-chitaaya Namah (ॐ अनेकार्चिताय नमः)
 Om Shivaaya Namah (ॐ शिवाय नमः)
 Om Shuddhaaya Namah (ॐ शुद्धाय नमः)
 Om Buddhi-priyaaya Namah (ॐ बुद्धिप्रियाय नमः)
 Om Shantaya Namah (ॐ शांताय नमः)
 Om Brahma-charine Namah (ॐ ब्रह्मचारिणे नमः)
 Om Gajana-naaya Namah (ॐ गजाननाय नमः)
 Om Dvai-madhuraaya Namah (ॐ द्वैमात्रेयाय नमः)
 Om Muni-stuthaaya Namah (ॐ मुनिस्तुताय नमः)
 Om Bhakta-vighna-vinashanaaya Namah (ॐ भक्तविघ्नविनाशनाय नमः)
 Om Eka-dhandaya Namah (ॐ एकदन्ताय नमः)
 Om Chatur-bhahave Namah (ॐ चतुर्बाहवे नमः)
 Om Chatu-raaya Namah (ॐ चतुराय नमः)
 Om Shakthi-sam-yutaaya Namah (ॐ शक्ति-सम्युताय नमः)
 Om Lambhodaraaya Namah (ॐ लम्बोदराय नमः)
 Om Shoorpa-karnaaya Namah (ॐ शूर्पकर्णाय नमः)
 Om Haraaye Namah (ॐ हराय नमः)
 Om Brahma-viduttamaaya Namah (ॐ ब्रह्मविदुत्तमाय नमः)
 Om Kalaaya Namah (ॐ कालाय नमः)
 Om  Graha-pataaye Namah (ॐ ग्रहपतये नमः)
 Om Kaamine Namah (ॐ कामिने नमः)
 Om Soma-suryagni-lochanaaya Namah (ॐ सोम सूर्याग्नि लोचनाय नमः)
 Om Pashankusha-dharaaya Namah (ॐ पाशाङ्कुशधराय नमः)
 Om Chandhaaya Namah (ॐ चण्डाय नमः)
 Om Guna-thitaaya Namah (ॐ गुणातीताय नमः)
 Om Niranjanaaya Namah (ॐ निरञ्जनाय नमः)
 Om Akalmashaaya Namah (ॐ अकल्मषाय नमः)
 Om Swayam-siddhaaya Namah (ॐ स्वयंसिद्धाय नमः)
 Om Siddhar-chita-padham-bujaaya Namah (ॐ सिद्धार्चितपदाम्बुजाय नमः)
 Om Bijapura-phala-sakthaaya Namah (ॐ बीजापुरफलासक्ताय नमः)
 Om Varadhaaya Namah (ॐ वरदाय नमः)
 Om Shashwataaya Namah (ॐ शाश्वताय नमः)
 Om Krithine Namah (ॐ कृतिने नमः)
 Om Vidhwat-priyaaya Namah (ॐ विद्वत्प्रियाय नमः)
 Om Vitha-bhayaaya Namah (ॐ वीतभयाय नमः)
 Om Gadhine Namah (ॐ गदिने नमः)
 Om Chakrine Namah (ॐ चक्रिणे नमः)
 Om Ikshu-chapa-dhrute Namah (ॐ इक्षुचापधृते नमः)
 Om Shridaaya Namah (ॐ श्रीदाय नमः)
 Om Ajaya Namah (ॐ अजाय नमः)
 Om Utphala-karaaya Namah (ॐ उत्फलकराय नमः)
 Om Shri-pataye Namah (ॐ श्रीपतये नमः)
 Om Stuthi-harshi-taaya Namah (ॐ स्तुति-हर्षिताय नमः)
 Om Kuladri-bhrite Namah (ॐ कुलाद्रि-भ्रिते नमः)
 Om Jatilaaya Namah (ॐ जटिलाय नमः)
 Om Kali-kalmasha-nashanaaya Namah (ॐ कलि कल्मष नाशनाय नमः)
 Om Chandra-chuda-manaye Namah (ॐ चन्द्रचूड़मानये नमः)
 Om Kantaaya Namah (ॐ कांताय नमः)
 Om Papahaarine Namah (ॐ पापहारिणे नमः)
 Om Sama-hithaaya Namah (ॐ समा-हिताय नमः)
 Om  Aashritaaya Namah (ॐ आश्रिताय नमः)
 Om Shrikaraaya Namah (ॐ श्रीकराय नमः)
 Om Sowmyaaya Namah (ॐ सौम्याय नमः)
 Om Bhakta-vamchita-dayakaaya Namah (ॐ भक्तवान्च्छित दायकाय नमः)
 Om Shantaaya Namah (ॐ शांताय नमः)
 Om Kaivalya-sukhadaaya Namah (ॐ कैवल्य-सुखदाय नमः)
 Om Sachida-nanda-vigrahaaya Namah (ॐ सच्चिदानन्दविग्रहाय नमः)
 Om Jnanine Namah (ॐ ज्ञानिने नमः)
 Om Dayayuthaaya Namah (ॐ दयायुताय नमः)
 Om Dandhaaya Namah (ॐ दण्डाय नमः)
 Om Brahma-dvesha-vivarjitaaya Namah (ॐ ब्रह्मद्वेषविवर्जिताय नमः)
 Om Pramatta-daitya-bhayadaaya Namah (ॐ प्रमत्त-दैत्याभयदाय नमः)
 Om Shrikanthaaya Namah (ॐ श्रीकांताय नमः)
 Om Vibudheshwaraaya Namah (ॐ विबुढ़ेश्वराय नमः)
 Om Ramarchitaaya Namah (ॐ रामार्चिताय नमः)
 Om Vidhaye Namah (ॐ विधाये नमः)
 Om Nagaraja-yagyno-pavitavaathe Namah (ॐ नागराज यज्ञिनो पवितवाते नमः)
 Om Sthulakanthaaya Namah (ॐ स्थूलकान्ताय नमः)
 Om Swayam-kartre Namah (ॐ स्वयं-कर्त्रे नमः)
 Om Sama-ghosha-priyaaya Namah (ॐ सम-घोष-प्रियाय नमः)
 Om Parasmai Namah (ॐ परस्मै नमः)
 Om Sthula-tundhaaya Namah (ॐ स्थूल तुण्डाय नमः)
 Om Agranyaaya Namah (ॐ अग्रण्याय नमः)
 Om Dhiraaya Namah (ॐ धीराय नमः)
 Om Vagishaaya Namah (ॐ वागीशाय नमः)
 Om Siddhi-dhayakaaya Namah (ॐ सिद्धिदायकाय नमः)
 Om Dhurva-bilwa-priyaaya Namah (ॐ दूर्वा बिल्व-प्रियाय नमः)
 Om Avyaktamurthaaye Namah (ॐ अव्यक्तमूर्ताये  नमः)
 Om Adbhuta-murthi-mathe Namah (ॐ अद्भुत-मूर्तिमते नमः)
 Om Shailendhra-tanu-jotsanga-khelanotsuka-manasaaya Namah (ॐ शैलेन्द्रतनु-जोत्सन्ग-खेलनोत्सुक-मनसाय नमः)
 Om Swalavanya-sudha-sarajitha-manmatha-vigrahaaya Namah (ॐ स्वलावण्य-सुधा-सर्जित-मन्मथ-विग्रहाय नमः)
 Om Samastha-jagada-dharaaya Namah (ॐ समस्त-जगत्धराय नमः)
 Om Mayine Namah (ॐ मायिने नमः)
 Om Mushika-vahanaaya Namah (ॐ मूषक-वाहनाय नमः)
 Om Hrishtaaya Namah (ॐ हृष्टाय नमः)
 Om Tushtaaya Namah (ॐ तुष्टाय नमः)
 Om Prasannatmane Namah (ॐ प्रसन्नात्मने नमः)
 Om Sarva-siddhi-pradhayakaaya Namah (ॐ सर्व-सिद्धि-प्रदायकाय नमः)

References

External links

Downloadable Sanskrit version of a variant of the Ganesha Sahasranama

Sahasranama
Ganesha